A Beuk o' Newcassell Sangs  is a pictorial book giving details of local songs, including the lyrics and in many cases, the music, and all beautifully illustrated with the author's own woodcuts. It was published in 1888. It was reprinted in 1965 by Harold Hill, Newcastle upon Tyne.

Details
 A Beuk o' Newcassell Sangs  – (full title – A Beuk o' Newcassell Sangs Collected by Joseph Crawhall , Mawson, Swan & Morgan, M.D. CCC.LXXXVIII) is a book containing approximately 35 songs complete with their lyrics, and in some cases, the music.

The Geordie folk songs all relate in some way or other to North East England, and many are in Geordie dialect. It was edited by Joseph Crawhall II.

The publication 
It is, as the title suggests, a collection of sangs (or in English "songs") from the Newcassel (or "Newcastle") area.

Contents 
Are as below :-

Notes
A-N1  –  according to George Allan's Tyneside Songs and Readings of 1891, the writer is Robert Nunn

S-C1  –  according to (Sir) Cuthbert Sharp's Bishoprick Garland of 1834, the writer is Thomas Clerke

See also 
Geordie dialect words
Joseph Crawhall II
Northumbrian Minstrelsy
Allan's Illustrated Edition of Tyneside Songs and Readings
Rhymes of Northern Bards

References

External links
 A Beuk o’ Newcassell Sangs
 The Crawhall family
 Joseph Crawhall II Society

English folk songs
Songs related to Newcastle upon Tyne
County Durham
Northumbrian folklore
1888 books
Chapbooks